Maneater is a 1973 American TV film directed by Vince Edwards. It was based on an idea of Edwards and shot over 11 days. Jimmy Sangster helped write the script.

Cast
Ben Gazzara as Nick Baron
Richard Basehart as Carl Brenner
Sheree North as Gloria Baron
Laurette Spang as Polly
Kip Niven as Shep Saunders

Plot
Two couples are chased after by two tigers.

References

External links
Maneater at BFI
Maneater at IMDb

1973 television films
1973 films
American television films